The Sanctuary of Truth is an unfinished museum in Pattaya, Thailand designed by Thai businessman Lek Viriyaphan. The museum structure is a hybrid of a temple and a castle that is themed on the Ayutthaya Kingdom and of Buddhist and Hindu beliefs. The building is notably constructed entirely out of wood, specifically Mai Deang, Mai Takien, Mai Panchaat, and Teak. It contains only wood-carved idols and sculptures. Construction first began in 1981 and is still in construction, though visitors are permitted inside with hard hats. Located on 13 hectares of land, the temple houses an internal space of 2,115 m2, with the tallest spire reaching to 30 m.

History 

The building has been under construction since 1981, and may not be finally completed until 2025 at the earliest. Though under construction, tourists are able to visit the sanctuary.

Theme 

The museum features a four-faced Hindu creator god Brahma statue on its rooftop for showing respect to father, mother, teacher, and the king, and the elephant-headed god Ganesha. The Northern hall features Buddhist Guanyin and other sculptures featuring wisdom of emancipation. The Southern hall features astronomical themes, namely the sun, moon, and other planets impacting people's well-being. The Western hall features representations of the classical elements (earth, water, wind, and fire) and sculptures of the Hindu Trinity: Lord Brahma, Vishnu, and Shiva, the gods who conquer the four elements. The Eastern hall features familial representations. The main focus is to visually portray important eastern religious concepts and the cycle of life.

Architecture 

Inspired by the temples in Ayutthaya, the hand-carved wood structure features Thai architecture. The museum was built by Lek Viriyaphan. Every surface of the structure is decorated with ornamentation from Thai, Hindu, Buddhist, Chinese, and Khmer traditions. 

The sanctuary is made of several different types of wood, giving different parts of the sanctuary different textures. The oldest wood that has been used is  wood, used to build the main post and expected to last for 600 years. The structure is composed of wood such as Xylia xylocarpa, and teakwood.

The wooden sanctuary is over 100 meters tall and makes for an impressive sight against the backdrop of the Gulf of Thailand. The indoor space is 2,115 square meters.

Activities 
 

In addition to guided tours of the building, the museum offers tourist activities such as ATV rides, cruises on traditional Thai gondolas, and controversial elephant rides. There is also a restaurant serving Thai and halal food, a miniature zoo, and an area where visitors can watch wood carvers at work on the ongoing construction.

See also
Ancient Siam
Luang Pu Bunleua Sulilat
Sala Keoku
Buddha Park
Chalermchai Kositpipat
Wat Rong Khun
Wat Pa Maha Chedi Kaew
Visionary environments

References

External links

Article about The Sanctuary Of Truth and many Photographs
Symbolism of the Sanctuary of Truth

Visionary environments
Traditional Thai architecture
Thai contemporary art
Buddhist architecture
Hindu temple architecture
Buildings and structures in Pattaya
Tourist attractions in Chonburi province
Wooden buildings and structures in Thailand